İbrahim Halil Fırat (born 1 January 1973) is a Turkish politician from the Justice and Development Party (AKP), who has served as a Member of Parliament for Adıyaman since 7 June 2015.

Born in Adıyaman, he graduated from Marmara University Faculty of Law and worked as a freelance lawyer for 12 years. He joined the AKP Adıyaman branch after the party's establishment in 2001, becoming a disciplinary and executive board member, eventually becoming the AKP Adıyaman branch president in 2011. He served as the branch president until December 2014, after which he was elected as an AKP Member of Parliament in the June 2015 general election.

See also
25th Parliament of Turkey

References

External links
 Collection of all relevant news items at Haberler.com

Justice and Development Party (Turkey) politicians
Deputies of Adıyaman
Members of the 25th Parliament of Turkey
Living people
People from Adıyaman
1973 births
21st-century Turkish lawyers
Marmara University alumni
Members of the 26th Parliament of Turkey